Shri Chhatrapati Shivaji Stadium or Kolhapur Cricket Association Ground is a multi-purpose stadium in Kolhapur, Maharashtra.  The stadium has hosted many of first-class and List A matches for Maharashtra cricket team. It also hosted the Santosh Trophy matches. The stadium is owned and managed by Kolhapur Cricket Association. It is named after a great Maratha warrior Shivaji who ruled Maharashtra for many years. Till date the stadium has hosted 14 first-class matches from 1952 to 2006 as well as one List A match in 1990  when Maharashtra cricket team took on in 18 run defeat over Wills' XI.

See also 

 Rajarshi Shahu Stadium
 Khasbag Wrestling Stadium

References

External links 
 Cricinfo
 Cricketarchive

Kolhapur
Cricket grounds in Maharashtra
Sports venues in Maharashtra
Sports venues in Kolhapur
1952 establishments in Bombay State
Sports venues completed in 1952
Monuments and memorials to Shivaji
20th-century architecture in India